Peter Barr may refer to:

 Peter Barr (accountant) (1861–1951), New Zealand accountant
 Peter Barr (nurseryman) (1826–1909), Scottish nurseryman and merchant
 Peter Barr (rower) (born 1950), Canadian Olympic rower